The 1946 Loyola Lions football team was an American football team that represented Loyola University of Los Angeles (now known as Loyola Marymount University) as an independent during the 1946 college football season. In their first and only season under head coach Tony DeLellis, the Lions compiled a 5–4 record.

Schedule

References

Loyola
Loyola Lions football seasons
Loyola Lions football